Achatinella viridans is a species of air-breathing land snail, a terrestrial pulmonate gastropod mollusc in the family Achatinellidae. This species is endemic to Hawaii.

Shell description
The dextral shell is elongate-conic, imperforate with convex whorls and a slightly impressed line below the suture. The shell has five whorls. The color is green with light streaks intermixed. The aperture is subovate and stained with
a pink color just within the margin. The lip is slightly thickened.

The height of the shell is 19.2 mm. The width of the shell is 12.0 mm.

References
This article incorporates public domain text (a public domain work of the United States Government) from reference.

viridans
Molluscs of Hawaii
Endemic fauna of the United States
Critically endangered fauna of the United States
Gastropods described in 1845
Taxonomy articles created by Polbot
ESA endangered species